Dino Diana (born 1883, date of death unknown) was an Italian fencer. He competed in the individual épée and sabre events at the 1908 Summer Olympics.

References

1883 births
Year of death missing
Sportspeople from Verona
Italian male fencers
Olympic fencers of Italy
Fencers at the 1908 Summer Olympics